Morris Warman (December 25, 1918 – April 16, 2010) was an American photographer who won many awards for his extraordinary photographs. His pictures often appeared on the front page of the New York Herald Tribune, where he was a staff photographer from 1943 to 1966. His work in photojournalism was distinguished by his use of ambient light instead of flash to create artistic pictures of daily news events. Beside producing remarkable photographs for news stories, Warman was widely acclaimed for his portraits of statesmen and other celebrities, which were displayed in exhibits such as Portraits of Our Time.

Earlier life
Warman was born in Poland at the end of 1918. When he was a child, his family migrated to the United States to escape anti-semitic persecution. They landed in Manhattan, and settled in Bayonne, New Jersey, where his father established a photographic studio that operated for half a century.
 
Assisting his father after school, the young Warman developed a passion for taking pictures and was determined to make photography his life's work. His first picture to the Bayonne Times was at the age of 10. His family lived in the New Jersey town, and he has taught by his father how to handle a camera, took a fantastic picture of an evicted family being from their home during the Great Depression. After graduating from Bayonne High School, he moved to New York City and worked as a free-lance photographer until he entered the United States Army in 1942. Having observed his excellent photographic work, the Army assigned him to the Signal Corps to take pictures for the post newspaper at Fort Meade, Maryland.

Career
Upon discharge from the service, Warman returned to New York City as a free-lance photographer. He impressed the New York Herald Tribune with his work and was hired as a staff photographer. He worked for the "Trib" for a quarter of a century, and his brother Manny was director of photography for Columbia University for nearly four decades.
 
In the 1940s, newspaper photographers used large, bulky Speed Graphic cameras that required flash bulbs to prevent blurring from camera movement. Warman preferred the soft hues created by time exposures to the harsh tones resulting from flash lighting. To employ ambient light, he pioneered the use of a small 35 mm camera that could be held steady long enough for a time exposure. This method produced esthetic images that had been rarely seen in daily newspapers previously. As other photographers emulated Warman's technique, the 35 mm camera replaced the bulky Speed Graphic in photojournalism.
 
Appreciating Warman's talent for portraiture, the New York Herald Tribune asked him to photograph all the speakers at their Annual Forum at Waldorf Astoria New York. His subjects included: Winston Churchill, David Ben Gurion, Dwight Eisenhower, Lyndon Johnson, Edith Piaf, Nelson Rockefeller, John F. Kennedy, Marian Anderson, Carl Sandburg, Robert Frost, William Faulkner, James Baldwin, Charles Atlas, Ernest Hemingway, Douglas MacArthur, Bertrand Russell, John Steinbeck and Ingrid Bergman. John Hay Whitney, former ambassador to United Kingdom, whose sister Joan Whitney Payson once owned the New York Mets, had tired of a yearly cash outflow of millions of dollars. The resulting portraits were highly praised by photographic critics.
 
Warman's favorite prize-winning picture was a profile of his son Ritchard as a boy. He used natural light to create an image with contrasting areas that give the picture the effect of a sculpture.
 
Warman's eye for composition is exemplified by a picture he took of the marching band at the 1964 New York World's Fair. The photograph creates an esthetic pattern of circles from a row of tubas, echoed by the huge World's Fair globe in the background. Like many of Warman's pictures, this photograph was reproduced in several publications.

In October 1960 he took some nice photos of Audrey Hepburn on the set of Breakfast at Tiffany's.

In 1960s he took many photoseries of The Beatles (e.g. Debut at The Ed Sullivan Show on February 9, 1964) and The Rolling Stones (e.g. Press conference at the Rainbow Room, N.Y.C. on November 27, 1969) Tours in America.

In 1973 Warman provided illustrations of musicians with their instruments for a book titled 'A Rainbow of Sound: The Instruments of the Orchestra and Their Music', written by his best friend, the musicologist Herbert Kupferberg.

Warman's feeling for people was evident in his personal life as well as his photographs. When he saw an intoxicated man fall off a subway platform, he jumped onto the tracks and dragged the victim to safety.
 
Warman was married to Dorothy Poplar of Philadelphia, who predeceased him. They resided in Forest Hills, New York until his death on April 16, 2010. He is survived by his son Ritchard, who is custodian of his photographic works.

Prizes, opinions
In 1959 he won New York Press Photographers Association contest, he was awarded the Society of Silurians first lifetime achievement award in photojournalism at the Players Club, The Silurians bill. The "Karsh of Queens" as he is called - made riveting photographs of world leaders and artists, but ask him his all-time favorite black-and-white photo, ones he doesn't lose a beat. "That's the one I took of my (3 years old) son Ritchie just after he had a double hernia operation at Mount Sinai...The lighting in his hospital room was terrific that day."

In his great 1986 book on the New York Herald Tribune, "The Paper," Pulitzer prizewinning writer Richard Kluger wrote that "Morris Warman is the best portraitist in U.S. daily journalism... That's telling it like it is. His work has been shown in galleries around the country. One show, «Portraits of the Famous», was shown at the last World's Fair in Queens, and even his colleagues agreed that the man who was also known as «No Bulb» Warman, for his refusal to use a flash with his 4x5 Speed Graphic in order to get a more dramatic picture, was a master at the art of portrait photography."
 
"A few years ago I went with Warman to a Manhattan gallery to view about two dozen of his photos taken between 1940 and 1960. It was history frozen in time by a master, who was, and still is, a great talent and a good friend." as Dennis Duggan, former Newsday Pulitzer Prize winning reporter has written.

Sources
 http://www.morriswarman.com/

External links
 http://www.silurians.org/photo-gallery/morris-warman/

References

American people of Polish-Jewish descent
1918 births
2010 deaths
American photographers
Bayonne High School alumni
People from Bayonne, New Jersey